Dante Córdova Blanco (born June 3, 1943) is a Peruvian lawyer, politician and businessman. He was Minister of Transport and Communications, Minister of Education and Prime Minister of Peru under President Alberto Fujimori.

Early life 

Dante Córdova completed his school studies at the National School of Our Lady of Guadalupe, graduating in 1960. He completed his higher studies at the National University of San Marcos obtaining a law degree.

He has developed various activities in the business and educational field, holding the following positions:

 Member of the National Council of Education (CNE)
 Member of the board of directors of the Centro de Información y Educación para la Prevención del Abuso de Drogas (CEDRO),
 Member of the Consultative Council of the Santillana Foundation,
 Director of the Center for Educational Innovations and Evaluations,
 Member of the Arbitration Center of the Lima Chamber of Commerce

Córdova served as director of the Peruvian Corporation of Airports and Commercial Aviation (CORPAC) and Petroperú.

Political career 
On February 3, 1993, during the presidency of Alberto Fujimori, he held the position of Minister of Transportation and Communications. Since August 28, 1993, the Ministry covered the offices of Housing, Construction and Sanitation until 1999. During its administration, road development was given impetus, reflected in the reconstruction of the Pan-American highway and the construction of rural roads was promoted.

On July 28, 1995, in Fujimori's second term, he was appointed Minister of Education and President of the Council of Ministers of Peru.

Between December 1996 and April 1997, he was one of the hostages in the seizure of the Japanese ambassador's residence by the MRTA.

See also
 President of the Council of Ministers of Peru
 Alberto Fujimori

References 

1943 births
Living people
20th-century Peruvian lawyers
Prime Ministers of Peru
Fujimorista politicians
Peruvian businesspeople